Eriophyllum nubigenum, the Yosemite woolly sunflower, is an uncommon flowering plant in the family Asteraceae. It is endemic to California, where it is known only from the Sierra Nevada in and around Yosemite National Park (in Tuolumne County and Mariposa County).

Description
Eriophyllum nubigenum is an annual herb with a densely woolly stem up to 15 centimeters (6 inches) tall. The oblong leaves are one to two centimeters (0.4-0.8 inches) long, untoothed, and woolly in texture. The inflorescence is a cluster of small golden yellow flower heads with 4-6  one-millimeter-long ray florets surrounding 10–20 disc florets.

References

External links
Jepson Manual Treatment - Eriophyllum nubigenum
United States Department of Agriculture Plants Profile; Eriophyllum nubigenum
Eriophyllum nubigenum - Calphotos Photo gallery, University of California

nubigenum
Endemic flora of California
Flora of the Sierra Nevada (United States)
Yosemite National Park
Plants described in 1883
Taxa named by Edward Lee Greene